The Deputy Speaker of the Lok Sabha is the second-highest ranking legislative officer of the Lok Sabha, the lower house of the parliament of India. They act as the presiding officer in the event of leave or absence caused by the death or illness of the speaker of the Lok Sabha. It is parliamentary convention to elect a deputy speaker of the Lok Sabha from a party other than the ruling party to run an accountable democratic parliament.

The deputy speaker is elected in the first meeting of the Lok Sabha after the general elections for a term of five years from among the members of the Lok Sabha. They hold office until either they cease to be members of the Lok Sabha or they resign. They can be removed from office by a resolution passed in the Lok Sabha by an effective majority of its members. In an effective majority, the majority should be 50% or more than 50% of the total strength of the house after removing the vacancies. Since the Deputy Speaker is accountable for the Lok Sabha, the elimination is done by the effective majority in the Lok Sabha only. There is no need to resign from their original party, though as a Deputy Speaker, they have to remain impartial.

The current Lok Sabha does not have a deputy speaker, and the post has been vacant since 23 June 2019.

List
Key
 Resigned
 Died in office
 Returned to office after a previous non-consecutive term

Statistics
List of deputy speakers by length of term

List by party

Parties by total duration (in days) of holding Deputy Speaker's Office

See also
Speaker of the Lok Sabha
Chairperson of the Rajya Sabha
Leader of the House in Lok Sabha
Secretary General of the Lok Sabha
Leader of the House in Rajya Sabha
Leader of the Opposition in Lok Sabha
Deputy Chairperson of the Rajya Sabha
Leader of the Opposition in Rajya Sabha

References

Notelist

External links
 Website of Loksabha
 Current Speaker's Details from Loksabha Website
 Parliament of India Website

 
Lists of political office-holders in India
Lists of legislative speakers in India
Lists of members of the Lok Sabha